Kam Lake is a territorial electoral district for the Legislative Assembly of the Northwest Territories, Canada.

It is one of seven districts that represent Yellowknife.

A larger-than-usual property tax increase in 2014 saw the area re-zoned by the City of Yellowknife and some of the restrictions around residential building in the industrial area modified.

Members of the Legislative Assembly (MLAs)

Election results

2019 election

2015 election

2011 election

2007 election

2003 election

1999 election

Notes

References

External links 
Website of the Legislative Assembly of Northwest Territories

Northwest Territories territorial electoral districts
Yellowknife
21st-century Canadian politicians